Just An Excuse (4 December 1998 – 30 June 2008) was a champion New Zealand Standardbred racehorse, notable for twice winning the New Zealand Trotting Cup, in 2003 and 2004.

Racing career

Bred by Ollie and Irene Haines, trained by Robert Mitchell, and driven by Todd Mitchell, Just An Excuse won the following major races in New Zealand and Australia:
 2004 New Zealand Free For All, beating Mister D G and Jagged Account
 2004 New Zealand Trotting Cup, beating Elsu and Howard Bromac
 2004 Ballarat Cup, beating Sokyola and Double Identity
 2003 New Zealand Trotting Cup beating Elsu and Jack Cade
 2003 New Zealand Messenger Championship, beating Sly Flyin and All Hart
 2003 Noel J Taylor Memorial Mile, beating All Hart and Jagged Account

Just An Excuse was also placed:
 third in the 2005 New Zealand Trotting Cup behind Mainland Banner and Alta Serena
 second in the 2003 Auckland Pacing Cup behind Elsu

It was a testament to his class that he won the two New Zealand Cups and the New Zealand Free For All in spite of top-class competitors such as Elsu and Mister D G.

Just An Excuse died on 30 June 2008, needing to be put down after he broke his leg.

See also
 Harness racing in New Zealand

References

1998 racehorse births
New Zealand standardbred racehorses
New Zealand Trotting Cup winners
2008 racehorse deaths